The list of shipwrecks in June 1823 includes all ships sunk, foundered, grounded, or otherwise lost during June 1823.

1 June

2 June

3 June

4 June

8 June

9 June

10 June

11 June

12 June

13 June

14 June

16 June

17 June

20 June

21 June

22 June

25 June

26 June

27 June

29 June

Unknown date

References

1823-06